On October 17, 2015, the Michigan Wolverines hosted the Michigan State Spartans as part of the Michigan–Michigan State football rivalry. The Spartans defeated the Wolverines 27–23 on the back of a fumbled punt return.

The game was ranked 82nd college football game of all time by ESPN. The game is infamous for the last play, in which punter Blake O'Neill fumbled the ball, which was picked up by Michigan State for a walk-off touchdown. Due to the radio call, the game has earned the nickname "Trouble With the Snap".

Background

The two teams had been battling each other in a rivalry since 1898.

Michigan

After a disappointing 5–7 record in the previous season, the Wolverines fired Brady Hoke as head coach and replaced him with Jim Harbaugh. The team also cleaned out its coaching staff, with 9 out of 12 coaching at the university for the first time. Harbaugh, a former Michigan quarterback under coach Bo Schembechler, had held head coaching gigs for the San Diego Toreros, Stanford Cardinals and the San Francisco 49ers; the latter of which produced three straight NFC championship appearances and one Super Bowl appearance.

The previous season saw the Wolverines' offense finish 13th in the Big Ten in scoring (20.9 ppg) and total offense (333.0 ypg).

The Wolverines came into the matchup having shutout their last three opponents, and allowing only 6.3 points per game.

Michigan State

The Spartans came off a 10–2 season that saw them second in the Big Ten Conference, behind eventual CFP champion Ohio State. Their offense ranked second in the Big Ten for scoring (43.1 ppg) and yards per game (496.5), while their defense ranked second in points allowed per game (19.9) and third in yards allowed per game (293.5). They also won their bowl game.

Broadcasting
The game was televised on ESPN and streamed on WatchESPN. The television broadcast became the most watched 3:30 p.m. game in college football history, and the most watched October game in 20 years. The streaming broadcast was the second most streamed regular season game in the history of WatchESPN, which was launched on October 25, 2010.

Game summary

First half

Sources:

    
    
    
    
    
    
    
    

The Spartans received the opening kickoff for a touchback. The drive was poised to become a 3–and–out before a 27 yard reception to Aaron Burbridge. The drive stalled then stalled out at the Spartans' own 47 yard line, and punted. The Wolverines downed the punt at their own 27 yard line. The Wolverines then failed to convert a first down and punted 80 yards to the Spartans' 2 yard line. The Spartans then immediately began marching down the field on a 16 play drive. They crossed midfield with the aid of a personal foul penalty. They reached the Wolverines' 28 yard line on 4th & 8 and failed to convert and turned the ball over on downs.

The Wolverines' picked up the ball at their own 28 yard line and began an 8 play 72 yard drive that ended in a touchdown to put the Wolverines up 7–0 early in the second quarter. Both teams then traded 3 and outs, before the Spartans' were awarded good field position on their own 46 yard line. Quarterback Connor Cook rushed for 6 yards, and crossed midfield on the back of a personal foul penalty, and were set up at the Wolverines' 24 yard line. The drive culminated in a 11-yard rushing touchdown to end the Wolverines' 212 minute shutout streak. The Wolverines responded with a 5 play 28 yard field goal drive aided by a 49 yard kickoff return. Kenny Allen hit a 38-yard field goal to put the Wolverines up 10–7. Both teams failed to score before the second half.

Second half
The second half began similarly to the beginning of the first. The Wolverines punted on a three-and-out and the Spartans turned the ball over on downs at their own 38 yard line. Lined up with excellent field position, the Wolverines marched down the field on a 6 play 38 yard drive culminating in a touchdown to put the Wolverines up 17–7. The Spartans responded by driving down the field for a touchdown, aided by a 27 yard completion and a 30 yard touchdown pass to put the Spartans at 14–17. The Wolverines then drove down the field 61 yards to set up a 21 yard field goal, which was completed to put the Wolverines up 20–14.

After three drives stalled out going into the fourth quarter, the Wolverines were poised to score when a punt return brought them to the Spartans' 28 yard line. However, they failed to convert a first down and settled for a 38-yard field goal, which was made to put the Wolverines up 23–14. The Spartans responded with a two play touchdown drive, aided by a 74 yard reception and a 1 yard rushing touchdown to put the Spartans back in contention trailing 21–23 with 8:56 remaining.

After three straight drives ending with punts, the Spartans took over with 4:54 left on their own 28 yard line. After an offsides penalty that put them at their own 33 and a sack that brought them to their 23 yard line, a 2nd & 15 conversion put them at their own 48 yard line. After a few rushing plays, the Spartans ended up at Michigan's 36 with 2:06 on the clock. After a sack, and three straight incompletions, the Spartans turned the ball over on downs with 1:42 on the clock.

The Wolverines began running out the clock, but were unable to convert a first down to put the game away.

Final play

The Wolverines were set to punt with 0:10 left in the game. Long snapper Scott Sypniewski was prepared to snap the ball to punter Blake O'Neill. However, the snap was low, and O'Neill muffed the punt. As he attempted to punt it over his head, O'Neill was hit by defenders and the ball fell to sophomore safety, Jalen Watts-Jackson. Aided by blockers in front, Watts-Jackson was able to rush 38 yards to the endzone, and scored the walk-off touchdown as he was dragged down in the endzone.

Broadcast calls
Whoa, he has trouble with the snap! And the ball is free! It’s picked up by Michigan State’s Jalen Watts-Jackson, and he scores! On the last play of the game! Unbelievable!
Sean McDonough provided the commentary for the final play, which was broadcast nationally.

OH! He fumbled the ball! Now he fumbled it up in the air! And it's picked up by Michigan State! At the 20, the 15, the 10. And he's gonna score! No time left you got to be kidding me. That you could not write. Michigan had the game on the line on the foot. And Michigan State... wins it with a 37 yard fumble return. On a... punt that is mishandled by Blake O'Neill. I don't know what to say.
Radio call for the University of Michigan.

Bad snap! Bobbled! Scooped up! Here come the Spartans! Down the sideline! Racing into the endzone! Raced into the endzone is Jalen Watts-Jackson. Touchdown, MSU! Folks, no flags! Piling on each other in the endzone! It's over! The Spartans win again! The Spartans win again!
Radio call for Michigan State University.

Aftermath
As Watts-Jackson fell into the endzone, he suffered a broken hip after ending up at the bottom of a celebratory dogpile and required surgery 

A fan in the stands suffered a heart attack at the culmination of the game. The fan was hospitalized and eventually recovered. Michigan State had also given the Paul Bunyan Trophy, a trophy which is given to the winner of any given Michigan–Michigan State game, to Michigan before the end of the game. A television broadcast of the game in Grand Rapids had begun their post-game report before the ending of the game.

Harbaugh met with President Barack Obama the Monday following their loss. 
It was a tough way to lose a football game. (Obama) told the fellas to keep their chin up and him and Michelle were watching the game and likes the way our team played and told our guys to keep it going.

References

2015 Big Ten Conference football season
vs. Michigan State 2015
vs. Michigan 2015
2015 in sports in Michigan
October 2015 sports events in the United States